In Your Hands may refer to:

 In Your Hands (2004 film), Danish film
 In Your Hands (2007 film), Italian film
 In Your Hands (2010 film), French film by Lola Doillon
 In Your Hands (2018 film), French film by Ludovic Bernard
 In Your Hands (album), album by Eliza Doolittle
 In Your Hands, album by Stella One Eleven
 "In Your Hands", a song by the power metal band Pharaoh from the album Bury the Light
 "In Your Hands", a song by Krystal Meyers from the album Make Some Noise